The 2018 Icelandic Cup, also known as Borgunarbikar for sponsorship reasons, was the 59th edition of the Icelandic national football cup. The 2017 winners and current holders of the cup are ÍBV after beating FH 1–0 in the final. The 2018 Icelandic Cup final was played on 15 September 2018 at Laugardalsvöllur, and won for the first time by Stjarnan after a penalty shootout against Breiðablik.

Calendar
Below are the dates for each round as given by the official schedule:

First round

Second round

Round of 32

Round of 16

Quarter-finals

Semi-finals

Final

Top goalscorers

References

External links

2018 in Icelandic football
2018 domestic association football cups
Icelandic Men's Football Cup